Speelman or Speelmans is a Dutch occupational surname. A speelman now exclusively means a (historical) musician, but in the past was used for a performing artist with other skills. Notable people with the surname include: 

Cornelis Speelman (1628–1684), Dutch Governor-General of the Dutch East Indies
Edward Speelman (1910–1994), English art dealer
Harry Speelman (1916–1994), American football player
Hermann Speelmans (1906–1960), German stage and film actor
Jon Speelman (born 1956), English chess player, mathematician and chess writer
Speelman baronets, members of the Speelman baronetcy; descendants of Cornelis Speelman

References

Dutch-language surnames
Occupational surnames

de:Speelman